Cornisepta festiva is a species of sea snail, a marine gastropod mollusk in the family Fissurellidae, the keyhole limpets and slit limpets.

Description
The shell grows to a height of 5 mm.

Distribution
This marine species is endemic to New Zealand.

References

 Powell A. W. B., New Zealand Mollusca, William Collins Publishers Ltd, Auckland, New Zealand 1979

External links
 To World Register of Marine Species

Fissurellidae
Gastropods described in 1966